GNU Anubis is open-source software for processing outgoing email. It operates between the mail user agent (MUA) and mail transport agent (MTA), and can perform various processing and conversion in accord with the sender's specified rules, based on a configurable regular expressions system. It operates as a proxy server, independently from mail user agents.

External links
 GNU Anubis homepage

Anubis